Ubaldo Mesa Estepa (November 20, 1973 in Nobsa – October 9, 2005 in San Cristóbal) was a male professional road cyclist from Colombia. He was the younger brother of Urbelino Mesa.

Mesa died from heart failure at age 31 after collapsing before a race.

Career

2001
1st in General Classification Vuelta a Chiriquí (PAN)
1st in Stage 5 Clásico RCN, Mosquera (COL)
7th in General Classification Vuelta a Colombia (COL)
2003
1st in Stage 5 Tour of the Gila, Gila Monster Race (USA)
2nd in General Classification Tour of the Gila (USA)
2005
1st in Stage 2 Tour of the Gila, Mogollon (USA)
3rd in General Classification Tour of the Gila (USA)

References

 

1973 births
2005 deaths
People from Nobsa
Colombian male cyclists
Sportspeople from Boyacá Department
20th-century Colombian people